Jane Porter (3 December 1775 – 24 May 1850) was an English historical novelist, dramatist and literary figure. Her bestselling novels, Thaddeus of Warsaw (1803) and The Scottish Chiefs (1810) are seen as among the earliest historical novels in a modern style and among the first to become bestsellers. They were abridged and remained popular among children well into the twentieth century.

Life
Jane Porter was born in Durham, England, the third of five children of the Irishman William Porter and Jane (née Blenkinsop) of Durham. Tall and beautiful as she grew up, young Jane Porter's grave air earned her the nickname Il Penseroso, after John Milton's poem. After her father's death, Jane's family moved to Edinburgh, where she studied at a charity school under the schoolmaster George Fulton. Her family was acquainted with Sir Walter Scott. After stints in Durham and Ireland, the Porter family moved to London in the 1790s, where the sisters entered a circle of famous and future-famous actors, artists, and literary women, including Elizabeth Inchbald, Anna Laetitia Barbauld, Hannah More, Elizabeth Hamilton, Selina Davenport, Elizabeth Benger and Mrs Champion de Crespigny.

Porter's siblings also achieved some fame. Her sister Anna Maria Porter was likewise a novelist. Her brother Sir Robert Ker Porter became a noted painter.

She died in Bristol at the age of 74.

Works
Porter is seen to have "crafted and pioneered many of the narrative tools most commonly associated with both the national tale and the historical novel," though her claims in her lifetime to have done so were often ridiculed and dismissed. Her 1810 work The Scottish Chiefs, about William Wallace, one of the earliest examples of the historical novel, was very successful. The French version was banned by Napoleon. It was said to have influenced Scott and other writers and has remained popular with Scottish children. The Pastor's Fireside (1817) was a story set in the 18th century about the later members of the House of Stuart. Though one of the most popular writers of her time, the profligacy and financial indecisions of her brothers kept her very poor, as she and Anna Maria were constantly obliged to use their incomes to pay off their brothers' debts.

Porter wrote Thaddeus of Warsaw in 1803, set in the late 18th century Polish–Lithuanian Commonwealth. Despite its success, Porter did not benefit financially, as its copyright was held by its various publishers. To gain income from it, she resorted to ostensibly new editions published with prefaces and minor changes. She applied unsuccessfully for a literary pension, and being personally "totally destitute or nearly so", had to move between homes of her friends.

Porter contributed to periodicals and wrote the play Switzerland (1819), which seems to have been deliberately sabotaged by its lead, Edmund Kean, and closed after its first performance. She is sometimes associated with the 1822 production Owen, Prince of Powys, which closed after only three performances, but this was actually by Samson Penley. 

Porter also wrote Tales Round a Winter Hearth (1821), Coming Out (1828) and The Field of Forty Footsteps (1828) with her sister, Anna Maria.. A romance, Sir Edward Seaward's Diary (1831), purporting to record actual circumstances and edited by Jane, was written by her brother, Dr William Ogilvie Porter, as letters in the University of Durham Porter archives show.

In her later years, Porter continued to write pieces for journals. Many appeared anonymously or were simply signed "J. P." Her wide-ranging topics included Peter the Great, Simón Bolívar, and the African explorer Dixon Denham.

Influences
Porter, like many contemporaries, was fascinated by Lord Byron. The villain in The Pastor's Fireside, Duke Wharton, has been said to cast "an unmistakably Byronic shadow". Additional influences on her writing included her schoolmaster George Fulton, Edmund Spenser's The Faerie Queene and Sir Philip Sidney's Arcadia. She in turn influenced writers in her time.

References

External links

Porter Family Collection at the Kenneth Spencer Research Library at the University of Kansas
Episode on Jane and Anna Maria Porter, with biographer Devoney Looser, at What'sHerName Podcast

Jane Porter biographies
Sister Novelists: The Trailblazing Porter Sisters, Who Paved the Way for Austen and the Brontës (Jane and Maria Porter) by Devoney Looser (2022)
reformation.org
indiana.edu
british-fiction.cf.ac.uk
What'sHerName Podcast

1776 births
1850 deaths
Scottish women novelists
19th-century Scottish writers
19th-century British women writers
Scottish historical novelists
Women historical novelists
Women of the Regency era
Writers of historical fiction set in the Middle Ages
Writers of historical fiction set in the early modern period